Hoy is an English, Scottish and Irish surname. The Irish origin of the name is derived from "Ó hEochaidh". Other surnames developed from "Ó hEochaidh" include: McKeogh, Kehoe, Hoey, Haughey, Haugh and Hough. Hoy is sometimes considered to be a variant of Haughey, and it is very common in Ulster. The first recording of the surname in Ireland is of one Elizabeth, daughter of Leuise and Martha Hoy, on February 8, 1646 at Holy Trinity (Christchurch), Cork.

People named Hoy include:
 Agnete Hoy (1914–2000), English potter
 Alexandra Hoy, Canadian jurist
 Andrew Hoy (born 1959), Australian equestrian
 Bettina Hoy (born 1962), German equestrian
 Bobby Hoy (born 1950), English former footballer
 Campbell Hoy (1893–1985), British flying ace
 Charles M. Hoy (1897–1923) an American museum collector, active in Australia and China
 Chris Hoy (born 1976), Scottish track cyclist
 Col Hoy, Australian cricket umpire
 Cyrus Hoy (1926–2010), American English scholar
 Dummy Hoy (1862–1961), American Major League Baseball player
 Elizabeth Hoy, Irish author
 Ernest Charles Hoy (1895-1982), Canadian First World War flying ace and aviation pioneer
 Frank Hoy (1934–2005), Irish-born Scottish professional wrestler
 Garry Hoy, Canadian lawyer
 Henry Hoy (1855–1910) British locomotive engineer
 James Hoy, Baron Hoy (1909-1976), Scottish politician
 James Barlow Hoy (1794-1843), Irish-born politician
 Jen Hoy (born 1991), American soccer player
 Linda Hoy, British children's author
 Marie Hoy, Australian musician
 Marjorie Hoy (born 1941), American entomologist and geneticist
 Mick Hoy (footballer), Irish footballer
 Mick Hoy (musician), Irish musician
 Pat Hoy (born 1950), Canadian politician
 Peter Hoy (born 1966), Canadian baseball player
 Phil Hoy (politician) (born 1937), American politician
 Phil Hoy (rugby union) (born 1987), English rugby union player
 Renate Hoy (born 1930), German actress
 Robert Hoy (1927–2010), American actor
 Roger Hoy (born 1946), English footballer
 Ron Hoy (born 1932), Australian rules footballer
 Shirley Hoy, Canadian bureaucrat
 Thomas Hoy (botanist) (c. 1750-1822)
 Thomas Hoy (poet) (1659-1718), English poet and physician
 William Hoy (disambiguation)

See also
 Cameron Van Hoy (born 1985), American actor
 Nikolaus van Hoy (1631–1679), Flemish Baroque painter
 Høy, another surname

Surnames of Irish origin
Ulaid